Firangi Bahu is a drama TV series on Sahara One is a mother-in-law and daughter-in-law story. Indira Krishna plays the role of the mother-in-law and Dutch actress Sippora Zoutewelle plays the daughter-in-law in the serial

Plot
This show portrays the story of the Desai family and their firangi bahu Camili. Featuring key social issues like alcoholism, cultural prejudice, abortion and modern Indian family values; the plot follows the couple from their romantic university days in London to the not-so-ideal reality of a multi-generational household in India, The Desai's.  Core changes in Hindustani culture, like the rejection of family-arranged marriages and modern romantic ideas promoting love-matches, serve to highlight the real-life adaptation of cultural views regarding family happiness in a more global India.  The tension between traditional and modern family values divides the family as the couple tries and eventually fails to obtain genuine family approval without inuring deep-seated prejudice, personal injury and social conflict.

Corruption and dishonesty poke at deeply emotionalized cultural differences when Camili's younger sister in law asks for her help only to twist her own tawdry karma into malicious family slander aimed at the firangi bahu.  In a dramatic display of black magick, family cultural pressure and cowardliness, others in the Desai family begin to conspire against Camili when a traditional paternal Auntie comes to visit.  This mother-in-law and daughter-in-law drama takes a nail-biting turn when the Desai elder Auntie plots to break up the marriage.

The elder Auntie unjustifiably calls Camili out publicly as a liar, belittles her, accusing Camili of eating meat, then of having a gambling addiction, and finally of hiding an abortion and conspiring for a divorce.  The mounting family tension spells doom for the innocent and unwitting Camili.  Fate folds as the malevolent curse strikes and Camili dies in A bus explosion forcing the whole family to admit their own truths or be haunted by her unrelenting memory.  BUT THEN....details are revealed while the family recovers from the loss of Camili that the Desai elder Auntie is eager to re-wed Pranay to the daughter of a family friend, who comes to stay with the Desai family.  Just as grief lifts from the house a new revelation changes everything, when a survivor of the bus bombing slowly begins to remember that she's the Friangi bahu, Camili!!!

Cast
 Sippora Zoutewelle as Camili Jonathan
 Rohit Bhardwaj as Pranay Desai  
 Indira Krishnan as Ranjan Desai
 Pranoti Pradhan as Asha Desai
 Deepmala Parmar as Dasika Desai
 Dilip Darbar 
 Hetal Puniwala as Prakash Desai
 Paresh Bhatt as Paresh Desai
 Kanishka Soni as Juhi
 Apara Mehta
 Jass Bhatia as Bakshish

References

2013 Indian television series debuts
2014 Indian television series endings
Sahara One original programming
Hindi-language television shows
Television series by Optimystix Entertainment